Elections to Perth and Kinross Council were held on 5 May 2022 as part of the 2022 Scottish local elections. 40 Councillors were elected from 12 multi-members electoral wards under the Single Transferable Vote electoral system. The Scottish Conservatives had run Perth and Kinross Council as a minority administration immediately prior to the election, with a previous coalition with the Scottish Liberal Democrats collapsing mid-way through the term. Twelve incumbent Councillors, including two group leaders, decided not to seek re-election whilst others stood again but lost their seats.

The Scottish National Party (SNP) gained one seat to become the largest group on the council, Scottish Labour gained a second seat, the Scottish Liberal Democrats remained steady, whilst the Scottish Conservatives lost four seats. The Scottish Greens increased their vote-share but did not gain representation. Four Independent candidates were elected, largely in rural wards.

Following the declaration of the results on Friday 6 May 2022, talks began between the political groupings to determine who will be able to form an administration, which will result in posts such as Committee Conveners, the Council Leader, and the Provost being allocated. The Conservative and LibDem groups will also need to appoint new group leaders.

Background

2017 Results 
Elections to Perth and Kinross Council were last held in 2017 as part of the 2017 Scottish local elections.

Composition changes 
There were changes to the political composition of the Council between 2017 and 2022 owing to the suspension of Councillors, defections, by-election results. Just before the election, the Scottish Conservatives had 17 Councillors, the SNP had 13 Councillors (down two compared to 2017), the Scottish Liberal Democrats had 5 (up one compared to 2017), Labour continued to have one Councillor, whilst there were four Independent or non-aligned Councillors.

By-elections 
Five by-elections were held between the 2017 and 2022 elections. Resignation of Conservative Councillor Michael Jamieson after being charged with possession of indecent images of children in 2017 and SNP Councillor Dave Doogan after his election as a Member of Parliament in the 2019 United Kingdom general election triggered by-elections in Perth City South and Perth City North. The deaths of Conservative Councillor Ian Campbell and SNP Councillors Bob Band and Henry Anderson also triggered by-elections in the Highland, Perth City South, and Almond and Earn wards.

Three by-elections did not change the political composition of the council. Conservative candidate Audrey Coates was elected to replace Jamieson in the first Perth City South by-election. John Duff won the Highland by-election to replace fellow Conservative Ian Campbell. The SNP's Ian Massie won the Perth City North by-election to replace Dave Doogan.

Two by-elections resulted in changes in political representation. Liz Barrett of the Scottish Liberal Democrats won the second Perth City South by-election, replacing the SNP's Bob Band. Scottish Conservative candidate Frank Smith won the final by-election of the term, replacing the SNP's Henry Anderson as a Councillor for the Almond and Earn.

Suspensions 
Further changes in political composition resulted from Councillors being suspended from their political parties. Two Councillors were suspended from the Scottish Conservatives and did not rejoin the group for the remainder of the Council term. Colin Stewart and Calum Purves, representing Strathmore and Kinross-shire, were suspended in 2019 after allegations about their conduct during a meeting of the council's Integration Joint Board. Only Purves, not Stewart, was later readmitted to the Conservative group. Audrey Coates, elected in the 2017 Perth City South by-election, was also suspended from the Conservative group after being charged with drink driving in 2020.

Defections 
Michael Barnacle, previously an Independent Councillor for Kinross-shire, joined the Scottish Conservatives in 2021, citing the prospect of a second referendum on Scottish independence and promises from the Conservative group to increase autonomy for Kinross-shire as his motivating favours.

Retiring Councillors 
12 incumbent Councillors did not seek re-election. These included the outgoing Leader of the council, Conservative Councillor Murray Lyle and the longest serving Councillor, the Scottish Liberal Democrats' Willie Wilson. In total, seven Conservative Councillors, three SNP Councillors, and two Liberal Democrat Councillors did not seek re-election.

Election results 

Note: "Votes" are the first preference votes. The net gain/loss and percentage changes relate to the result of the previous Scottish local elections on 4 May 2017. This may differ from other published sources showing gain/loss relative to seats held at dissolution of Scotland's councils.

|- class="unsortable" align="centre"
!rowspan=2 align="left"|Ward
! % 
!Cllrs
! %
!Cllrs
! %
!Cllrs
! %
!Cllrs
! %
!Cllrs
! %
!Cllrs
!rowspan=2|TotalCllrs
|- class="unsortable" align="center"
!colspan=2 bgcolor="" | SNP
!colspan=2 bgcolor="" | Lab
!colspan=2 bgcolor=""| Conservative
!colspan=2 bgcolor="" | Green
!colspan=2 bgcolor="" | Lib Dem
!colspan=2 bgcolor="white"| Others
|-
|align="left"|Carse of Gowrie
|bgcolor="" |31.5
|bgcolor="" |1
|27.8
|1
|30.9
|1
|5.1
|0
|3.3
|0
|1.3
|0
|3
|-
|align="left"|Strathmore
|bgcolor="" |36.2
|bgcolor="" |2
|colspan="2" 
|30.2
|1
|7.4
|0
|8.8
|0
|17.4
|1
|3
|-
|align="left"|Blairgowrie and Glens
|40.3
|1
|5.0
|0
|bgcolor="" |45.5
|bgcolor="" |2
|3.6
|0
|5.5
|0
|2.2
|0
|3
|-
|align="left"|Highland
|bgcolor="" |36.3
|bgcolor="" |1
|3.3
|0
|30.9
|1
|4.6
|0
|2.0
|0
|21.9
|1
|3
|-
|align="left"|Strathtay
|bgcolor="" |46.5
|bgcolor="" |1
|colspan="2" 
|34.9
|1
|colspan="2" 
|18.7
|1
|colspan="2" 
|3
|-
|align="left"|Strathearn
|bgcolor="" |33.0
|bgcolor="" |1
|colspan="2" 
|29.9
|1
|colspan="2" 
|5.8
|0
|31.2
|1
|3
|-
|align="left"|Strathallan
|35.0
|1
|colspan="2" 
|bgcolor="" |46.6
|bgcolor="" |2
|7.0
|0
|11.4
|0
|colspan="2" 
|3
|-
|align="left"|Kinross-shire
|25.5
|1
|6.8
|0
|bgcolor="" |29.3
|bgcolor="" |1
|5.2
|0
|20.9
|1
|12.1
|1
|4
|-
|align="left"|Almond and Earn
|33.8
|1
|colspan="2" 
|bgcolor="" |48.3
|bgcolor="" |2
|7.9
|0
|8.8
|0
|1.3
|0
|3
|-
|align="left"|Perth City South
|33.6
|2
|5.6
|0
|22.8
|1
|4.1
|0
|bgcolor="#FAA61A"|33.9
|bgcolor="#FAA61A"|1
|colspan="2" 
|4
|-
|align="left"|Perth City North
|bgcolor="" |55.2
|bgcolor="" |2
|15.3
|1
|19.6
|0
|3.5
|0
|4.3
|0
|2.2
|0
|3
|-
|align="left"|Perth City Centre
|bgcolor="" |39.9
|bgcolor="" |2
|8.3
|0
|24.8
|1
|5.1
|0
|19.8
|1
|2.2
|0
|4
|}

Ward results

Carse of Gowrie (Ward 1) 
Incumbent Councillors Alasdair Bailey (Labour) and Angus Forbes (Conservative) were re-elected. Ken Harvey (SNP) was elected for the first time. John Kellas, formerly the SNP Councillor for Strathtay, stood as a second SNP candidate but was not elected. There was no change in  political representation from the 2017 election, remaining as one Labour, one Conservative, and one SNP.

Strathmore (Ward 2) 
Perth & Kinross' Provost and incumbent Councillor Dennis Melloy was not re-elected, with party colleague Hugh Anderson elected for the first time. Colin Stewart, first elected in 2017 but subsequently suspended from the Conservatives over allegations of bullying, was elected as an Independent, whilst the SNP's Grant Stewart and Jack Welch were both elected for the first time. Incumbent Liberal Democrat Councillor Lewis Simpson did not seek re-election. The Scottish National Party and Independents gained a seat compared to 2017, whilst the Liberal Democrats and Conservatives lost one.

Blairgowrie and Glens (Ward 3) 
Incumbent Councillors Bob Brawn (Conservative), Tom McEwen (SNP) and Caroline Shiers (Conservative) were re-elected. There was no change in  political representation from the 2017 election, remaining as two Conservative and one SNP.

Highland (Ward 4) 
Incumbent Councillors John Duff (Conservative), Xander McDade (Independent) and Michael Williamson (SNP) were re-elected. There was no change in political representation from the 2017 election, remaining as one Conservative, one Independent and one SNP.

Strathtay (Ward 5) 
Incumbent Councillors Ian James (Conservative) and Grant Laing (SNP) were re-elected. Claire McLaren (Liberal Democrats) was elected for the first time and incumbent Councillor Anne Jarvis (Conservative) was not re-elected. Liberal Democrats gained the seat from the conservatives. 2022 political representation is now one Conservative, one SNP and one Liberal Democrat.

Strathearn (Ward 6) 
Incumbent Councillors Rhona Brock (Independent) and Stewart Donaldson (SNP) were re-elected. Unlike 2017, the Conservatives only stood one candidate and their candidate, Noah Khogali, was elected for the first time and is the youngest representative on the Council. There was no change in political representation from the 2017 election, remaining as one Independent, one SNP and one Conservative.

Strathallan (Ward 7) 
Council leader Murray Lyle (Conservative) and Tom Gray (SNP) stood down at this election. Incumbent Councillor Crawford Reid (Conservative) was re-elected. Keith Allen (Conservative) and Steven Carr (SNP) were elected for the first time. There was no change in political representation from the 2017 election, remaining two Conservatives and one SNP.

Kinross-Shire (Ward 8)
Incumbent Councillors Callum Purves (Conservative) and Mike Barnacle (Independent/Conservative) stood down at this election. Incumbent Councillors Willie Robertson (Liberal Democrats) and Richard Watters (SNP) were re-elected. Neil Freshwater (Conservative) was elected for the first time. Former Councillor Dave Cuthbert (Independent) is back representing Kinross-shire after being elected. There was no change in political representation from the 2017 election, remaining one SNP, one Liberal Democrat, one Conservative and one Independent.

Almond and Earn (Ward 9) 
Deputy Provost and incumbent Councillor Kathleen Baird (Conservative) stood down at this election. Incumbent Councillors David Illingworth (Conservative) and Frank Smith (Conservative) were re-elected. Unlike 2017, the SNP only stood one candidate and Michelle Frampton was elected for the first time. There was no change in political representation from the 2017 election, remaining two Conservatives and one SNP.

Perth City South (Ward 10) 
Incumbent Councillors Liz Barrett (Liberal Democrats) and Sheila McCole (SNP) were re-elected. Andy Chan (Conservative) and Iain Macpherson (SNP) were elected for the first time. There was no change in political representation from the 2017 election, remaining two SNP, one Liberal Democrat and one Conservative.

Perth City North (Ward 11) 
Incumbent Councillors Ian Massie (SNP) and John Rebbeck (SNP) were re-elected. Incumbent Councillor Harry Coates (Conservative) stood down at this election and Brian Leishman (Labour) won the 3rd seat over the conservative candidate, Aziz Rehman. The political representation is now two SNP and one Labour.

Perth City Centre (Ward 12) 
Incumbent Councillors Chris Ahern (Conservative), Peter Barrett (Liberal Democrats), Eric Drysdale (SNP) and Andrew Parrott (SNP) were all re-elected. There was no change in political representation from the 2017 election, remaining two SNP, one Conservative and one Liberal Democrat.

References

Perth and Kinross Council elections
Perth